Gordon "Gordie" Randall Hall (born November 27, 1935) is an American water polo player who competed in the 1960 Summer Olympics. He was born in Long Beach, California.  Hall studied at UC Berkeley where he played on the water polo team. Hall was a member of the American water polo team which finished seventh in the 1960 tournament. He played three matches as goalkeeper. In 2000, he was inducted into the USA Water Polo Hall of Fame.

See also
 List of men's Olympic water polo tournament goalkeepers

References

External links
 

1935 births
Living people
American male water polo players
Water polo goalkeepers
Olympic water polo players of the United States
Water polo players at the 1960 Summer Olympics
California Golden Bears men's water polo players